Turrbal is an Aboriginal Australian language of Queensland. It is the language of the Turrbal people, who are often recognised as one of the traditional owners and custodians of Brisbane.

The Turrbal Association uses the Turrbal spelling and prefer this over other spellings of Turrbal such as Turubul, Turrubal, Turrabul, Toorbal, and Tarabul.

The four dialects listed in Dixon (2002) are sometimes seen as separate Durubalic languages, especially Jandai and Nunukul; Yagara, Yugarabul, and Turrbul proper are more likely to be considered dialects.

Classification
Turrbal (E86) has been variously classified as a language, group of languages or as a dialect of another language.

F. J. Watson classifies Turrbal  (E86) as a sub group of Yugarabul E66 , which is most likely the language Yagara E23.

Norman Tindale uses the term Turrbal (E86) to refers to speakers of the language of Yagara E23.

John Steele classifies Turrbal (E86) as a language within the Yagara language group.

R. M. W. Dixon classifies Turrbal as a dialect of the language of Yagera, in the technical linguistic sense where mutually intelligible dialects are deemed to belong to a single language.

Influence on other languages
The Australian English word yakka, an informal term referring to any work, especially of strenuous kind, comes from the Yagara word yaga, the verb for 'work'.

The literary journal Meanjin takes its name from meanjin, a Turrbal word meaning 'spike', referring to the spike of land Brisbane was later built on.

Vocabulary 
Some words from the Turrbal / Yagara language, as spelt and written by Turrbal / Yagara authors include:

 Bigi: sun
 Binung: ear
 Bugwal: wallaby
 Buneen: echidna
 Bangil / bungil: grass
 Buhn: knee
 Buyu: shin
 Deear : teeth
 Dhagun: land
 Dhambur : mouth
 Dharang: leg
 Dhiggeri: belly / stomach
 Dinna: foot
 Dyrrbin: bone
 Gahm: head
 Giga: shoulder
 Gurumba bigi: good day
 Gujah / guttah: snake
 Gagarr / guyurr: fish
 Juhrram: rain
 Juwahduwan / juwahnduwan / juwanbinl: bird(s)
 Killen: finger
 Kundul: canoe
 Marra: hand
 Dumbirrbi / marrambi: koala
 Mil: eye / eyes
 Guruman / murri: kangaroo
 Muru: nose
 Nammul: children
 Nggurrun: neck
 Ngumbi: home / camp
 Tahbil: water (fresh)
 Towan: fish
 Tullei: tree
 Waiyebba: arm
 Wunya: welcome / greetings
 Yilam: forehead

References

Further reading 

 Indigenous Language Wordlists: Turubul Body Parts, published by State Library of Queensland under CC-BY license, accessed 14 June 2022
 Indigenous Language Wordlists: Yugarabul Body Parts, published by State Library of Queensland under CC-BY license, accessed 14 June 2022
 Indigenous Language Wordlists: Yugara Everyday Words, published by State Library of Queensland under CC-BY license, accessed 14 June 2022

Durubalic languages
Extinct languages of Queensland